The Duerna is a river in the province of León, Spain. It begins at the convergence of the Cabrito and Ballina streams, in the town of Pobladura de la Sierra, in the Lucillo municipality.

Rivers of Spain
Rivers of León, Spain
Rivers of Castile and León